"Barefootin'" is a 1966 song written and performed by Robert Parker. "Barefootin'" was arranged and produced by Wardell Quezergue in 1965. Parker's record label, Nola Records, claimed that the record sold over one million copies.

Chart performance
The song reached No.2 on the U.S. Hot Rhythm & Blues Singles chart and No.7 on the Billboard Hot 100. It also peaked at No.11 on the Cash Box Top 100 in June 1966.  Outside the US, the track reached No.7 in Canada in June 1966 and No.24 in the UK Singles Chart in September 1966.

Other versions 
In 1987 a claymation music video was produced by Aardman Animations taking place in outer space with aliens singing. Aardman Animations were approached by Charly Records who owned the back catalog rights to many classic R&B tracks. In the late '80s, classic R&B charted at the lower 100 on the charts and sometimes the owner would spend some marketing money on a song hoping to kick it into the top 20.

The song is included as a full-length performance by Walter "Wolfman" Washington and house band in the 2005 documentary film Make It Funky!, which presents a history of New Orleans music and its influence on rhythm and blues, rock and roll, funk and jazz.

The song was covered on the 1989 album Southern Star by the American country music band Alabama. Lead vocals were sung by the bands lead guitarist/fiddler Jeff Cook.

References 

1966 songs
Robert Parker (singer) songs
Music videos by Aardman Animations
1966 singles